Penelope Houston (born December 17, 1958) is an American singer-songwriter best known as the singer for the San Francisco-based punk rock band the Avengers. She was raised in Seattle. In the mid-1970s she attended Fairhaven College in Bellingham, Washington.  In 1977, Houston moved to San Francisco, attended the San Francisco Art Institute, and shortly after became the lead singer and songwriter for the Avengers. That band released one album, their eponymous debut in 1983.

Following the group's demise in 1979, Houston moved first to Los Angeles to work in film and video with The Screamers and director Rene Daalder, then to England where she collaborated with Howard Devoto on his post-Magazine projects. In the mid-1980s, she returned to San Francisco and helped originate the West Coast neo-folk movement. In 1986, she was featured alongside Tomata du Plenty of The Screamers in the punk rock musical Population: 1. By 1996 she had toured Europe extensively, signed with WEA Germany (Warner Brothers) and earned numerous awards with the dozen albums, which blended influences of punk, folk, rock, blues and Americana into her dark unique acoustic sound.

Her first full-length album was Birdboys which came out in 1987. Her most recent album is 2012's On Market Street.

Shortly after the release of Pale Green Girl, Houston and original guitarist Greg Ingraham recreated the Avengers, adding bassist Joel Reader (formerly of The Mr. T Experience, and The Plus Ones) and drummer Luis Illades (of Pansy Division, formerly also of The Plus Ones) to round out the lineup. Since the spring of 2004 she has toured the U.S. and Europe with this lineup. She continues to play her solo material, mainly in the San Francisco Bay Area.

In August 2012, Houston conducted an audio interview with Music Life Radio.

Discography

References

External links
official Penelope Houston/Avengers site
Penelope Houston Myspace page
Penelope Houston discography
Population: 1 official website

1958 births
Living people
American women singer-songwriters
Women punk rock singers
San Francisco Art Institute alumni
Musicians from the San Francisco Bay Area
Singer-songwriters from California
Avengers (band) members
Glitterhouse Records artists
21st-century American women
Women in punk